The Megaminx or Mégaminx is a dodecahedron-shaped puzzle similar to the Rubik's Cube. It has a total of 50 movable pieces to rearrange, compared to the 20 movable pieces of the Rubik's Cube.

History 
The Megaminx, or Magic Dodecahedron, was invented by several people independently and produced by several different manufacturers with slightly different designs. Uwe Mèffert eventually bought the rights to some of the patents and continues to sell it in his puzzle shop under the Megaminx moniker. It is also known by the name Hungarian Supernova, invented by Dr. Christoph Bandelow. His version came out first, shortly followed by Meffert's Megaminx. The proportions of the two puzzles are slightly different.

Description 
The Megaminx is made in the shape of a dodecahedron, and has 12 faces and center pieces, 20 corner pieces, and 30 edge pieces. The face centers each have a single color, which identifies the color of that face in the solved state. The edge pieces have two colors, and the corner pieces have three. Each face contains a center piece, 5 corner pieces and 5 edge pieces. The corner and edge pieces are shared with adjacent faces. The face centers can only rotate in place, but the other pieces can be permuted by twisting the face layer around the face center.

There are two main versions of the Megaminx. The 6-color variant uses the 6 colors common to puzzle cubes - white, yellow, blue, green, red and orange - with opposite faces having the same color. The 12-color variant uses a unique color for each face of the puzzle. The most common 12-color scheme starts with white bordered by yellow, dark blue, red, dark green and purple. Directly opposite each of these faces, respectively, are gray, beige, light blue, orange, light green and pink. Black is a common alternate face color, either replacing gray which improves color contrast on what is typically the last layer solved, or replacing beige, which typically shares two neighbors (red and green) with the white face which can make piece identification challenging in certain lighting conditions. The 12-color Megaminx is the only type legal in official WCA competitions (color scheme variations are legal as long as each face is uniquely-colored), and is therefore much more popular than the 6-color version.

The objective of the puzzle, similar to that of a Rubik's Cube or related puzzles, is to scramble the colors, and then restore it to its original state of having one color per face by turning each face in sequence to reorient/reposition the edge and corner pieces adjacent to that face's center piece.

Solutions 
Regardless of color variant, the most common solution strategy shares qualities with common methods for solving a Rubik's Cube. The solution begins with one face (most often white), where the solver will reconstruct the "star" formed by the edge pieces adjacent to that face, each one properly paired with the neighboring center color (analogous to the "white cross" of the beginner and CFOP methods for a Rubik's Cube). Once this is done, the five white corner pieces are maneuvered into place, commonly paired with the appropriate edge piece on the opposing side of each corner from the starting face. The star, first five corners and first five edges are known as the "first two layers", similar to those of a 3x3 cube. From here, the solver will typically proceed to the "second two layers", which involves a similar process of joining and positioning corner and edge pieces around the equator of the puzzle, and then the corners and edges in the hemisphere opposite the starting face. This is all typically done "intuitively", turning faces of the puzzle based on where the solver wishes the pieces to move, with the result of each move being predictable given some experience manipulating the puzzle. 

This leaves the solver with the "last face", most commonly grey (opposite the white starting face), which will require a series of more complicated move sequences to orient (flip/rotate) and permute (rearrange) the pieces of the last layer in predefined ways without disturbing the solved lower layers. These "algorithms" are similar to those used on a Rubik's Cube and thus familiar to those experienced in solving one, with the obvious allowance made for the extra side of each face (and thus the extra turn possible as part of a full revolution of the face). The "beginner" method requires only four or five algorithms of between three and six moves each to be memorized, which will be used to orient and then permute the last layer's edge pieces to form the last layer star, followed by orienting and permuting last layer corners. More complicated algorithm sets require memorization of a wider variety of distinct sequences of longer length, which nevertheless are more efficient solutions for each of a more specific set of possible permutations of the latest layer's pieces, performing orientation and permutation of both edges and corners in fewer sequences (and total moves) than the shorter but more repetitive beginner algorithms.

The 6-color Megaminx comes with an additional challenge which is not immediately obvious (and which does not occur on the 12-color puzzle). Its edge pieces come in visually identical pairs, because of the duplicated colors of opposite faces. However, although visually indistinguishable, they are nevertheless mathematically bound in a parity relationship. In any legal position (reachable from the solved state without disassembling the puzzle), there is always an even number of swapped pairs of edges. However, since swaps may be between visually identical edges, one may find that having solved almost the entire puzzle, one is left with a pair of swapped (distinct) edges that seems to defy all attempts to exchange them. The solution is to swap a single pair of 'identical' edges to resolve the parity issue, and then restore the rest of the puzzle.

This property is absent in the 12-color Megaminx, because all its edges are distinguishable, and it would be immediately obvious that there is another pair of swapped edges besides the pair one is working with. "Impossible" permutations of a 12-color Megaminx, causing behaviors inconsistent with the expectations of a solving method, are the result of manipulations not possible solely by turning the faces during a scramble or solve. The most common is a "corner twist", an often-necessary side effect of puzzles designed to allow some misalignment of a face when beginning rotation of an adjacent face (so-called "corner-cutting"). The looser tolerances allow a corner to be rotated in place, independent of any other face or corner, placing the puzzle in a permutation that face turns alone cannot solve. Most other "impossible" permutations of the puzzle are the result of improper assembly, and are avoided by always reassembling the puzzle into a solved state after disassembly for cleaning, maintenance or adjustment.

Variations 
There are many similar puzzles with different numbers of layers, most of which change the "mega" in the puzzle's name to another metric prefix. They are the Kilominx (2 layers), Master Kilominx (4 layers), Gigaminx (5 layers), Elite Kilominx (6 layers), Teraminx (7 layers), 8×8 Kilominx (8 layers), Petaminx (9 layers), Examinx (11 layers), Zettaminx (13 layers), Yottaminx (15 layers), and Atlasminx Or Quettaminx (19 layers). The highest order mass-produced variant of the Megaminx is the Zettaminx, which was released by ShengShou in 2021, and the highest order variant of the Megaminx ever made to date is the Minx of Madness, created by Corenpuzzle using 3D printing. The Minx of Madness was revealed in May 2022. It is the dodecahedral equivalent to a 21x21x21 Rubik's cube.

Alexander's Star is equivalent to solving only the edges of a six-color Megaminx.

The Impossiball and Kilominx are equivalent to solving only the corners of a Megaminx, but are very different mechanically. The Impossiball is available with either six or twelve colors.

The Pyraminx Crystal is a modified Megaminx with deeper turning planes.

Tony Fisher has produced a shape modification of the Megaminx into a cube form which he called the Hexaminx. Another variant is the Holey Megaminx, which has no center pieces, like the Void Cube. It is being produced by Mèffert as of July 2009. Other variants include the Flowerminx, Megaminx Ball, and Crazy Megaminx.

Number of combinations 

The Megaminx has 20 corners and 30 edges. It is possible on a Rubik's Cube to have a single pair of corners and a single pair of edges swapped, with the rest of the puzzle being solved. The corner and edge permutations are each odd in this example, but their sum is even. This parity situation is impossible on the Megaminx. For both types of pieces, only even permutations are possible, regardless of the position of the other set of pieces. There are 20!/2 ways to arrange the corners and 319 ways to orient them, since the orientation of the last corner depends on that of the preceding ones. There are 30!/2 ways to arrange the edges and 229 ways to flip them.

The full number is 100 669 616 553 523 347 122 516 032 313 645 505 168 688 116 411 019 768 627 200 000 000 000 (roughly 101 unvigintillion on the short scale or 101 undecillion on the long scale).

The corners are distinguishable on a 6-color Megaminx because two corners with the same three colors will be mirror images of each other. There are 15 pairs of identical edges. It would not be possible to swap all 15 pairs, since this would be an odd permutation of the edges, so a reducing factor of 214 is applied to the preceding figure.

The full number is 6 144 385 775 971 883 979 645 753 925 393 402 415 081 061 792 664 780 800 000 000 000 (roughly 6.1 vigintillion on the short scale or 6.1 decilliard on the long scale).

For the larger size variations (gigaminx, teraminx, petaminx etc.), the general number of combinations is  where  respectively for megaminx, gigaminx, teraminx, petaminx, etc.

Records 

The world record time for a Megaminx solve is 25.24 seconds, set by Juan Pablo Huanqui of Peru on 13 March 2022 at Lima Cuberano, in Lima, Peru.

The world record average of five solves (excluding best and worst) is 28.56 seconds, set by Leandro Martín López of Argentina on 19 November 2022 at Buenos Aires Cubea 2022 in Buenos Aires, with the times of 28.48, 28.56, (27.98), (30.41), 28.63 seconds.

Top 5 solvers by single solve

Top 5 solvers by average of 5 solves

See also 
Impossiball
Alexander's Star
Pyraminx Crystal
 Pocket Cube
 Rubik's Cube
 Rubik's Revenge
 Professor's Cube
 V-Cube 6
 V-Cube 7
 V-Cube 8
Pyraminx
Skewb Diamond
Tuttminx
Dogic
Combination puzzles
Magic 120-cell

References

External links 
 Meffert's puzzle shop
 Jaap's Megaminx page—contains solutions and other information

Combination puzzles
Mechanical puzzles
Rubik's Cube